In mathematics, the Smith–Volterra–Cantor set (SVC), fat Cantor set, or ε-Cantor set is an example of a set of points on the real line that is nowhere dense (in particular it contains no intervals), yet has positive measure. The Smith–Volterra–Cantor set is named after the mathematicians Henry Smith, Vito Volterra and Georg Cantor.  In an 1875 paper, Smith discussed a nowhere-dense set of positive measure on the real line, and Volterra introduced a similar example in 1881.  The Cantor set as we know it today followed in 1883. The Smith–Volterra–Cantor set is topologically equivalent to the middle-thirds Cantor set.

Construction

Similar to the construction of the Cantor set, the Smith–Volterra–Cantor set is constructed by removing certain intervals from the unit interval  

The process begins by removing the middle 1/4 from the interval (the same as removing 1/8 on either side of the middle point at 1/2) so the remaining set is 

The following steps consist of removing subintervals of width  from the middle of each of the  remaining intervals.

Continuing indefinitely with this removal, the Smith–Volterra–Cantor set is then the set of points that are never removed. The image below shows the initial set and five iterations of this process. 

Each subsequent iterate in the Smith–Volterra–Cantor set's construction removes proportionally less from the remaining intervals.  This stands in contrast to the Cantor set, where the proportion removed from each interval remains constant.  Thus, the former has positive measure while the latter has zero measure.

Properties

By construction, the Smith–Volterra–Cantor set contains no intervals and therefore has empty interior. It is also the intersection of a sequence of closed sets, which means that it is closed.
During the process, intervals of total length 
 
are removed from  showing that the set of the remaining points has a positive measure of 1/2. This makes the Smith–Volterra–Cantor set an example of a closed set whose boundary has positive Lebesgue measure.

Other fat Cantor sets

In general, one can remove  from each remaining subinterval at the th step of the algorithm, and end up with a Cantor-like set. The resulting set will have positive measure if and only if the sum of the sequence is less than the measure of the initial interval.

Cartesian products of Smith–Volterra–Cantor sets can be used to find totally disconnected sets in higher dimensions with nonzero measure. By applying the Denjoy–Riesz theorem to a two-dimensional set of this type, it is possible to find an Osgood curve, a Jordan curve such that the points on the curve have positive area.

See also

 The Smith–Volterra–Cantor set is used in the construction of Volterra's function (see external link).
 The Smith–Volterra–Cantor set is an example of a compact set that is not Jordan measurable, see Jordan measure#Extension to more complicated sets.
 The indicator function of the Smith–Volterra–Cantor set is an example of a bounded function that is not Riemann integrable on (0,1) and moreover, is not equal almost everywhere to a Riemann integrable function, see Riemann integral#Examples.

References

Fractals
Measure theory
Sets of real numbers
Topological spaces